Wee Willie Winkie is a 1937 American adventure drama film directed by John Ford and starring Shirley Temple, Victor McLaglen, and Cesar Romero. The screenplay by Julien Josephson and Ernest Pascal was based on a story by Rudyard Kipling. The film's story concerns the British presence in 19th-century India. The production was filmed largely at the Iverson Movie Ranch in Chatsworth, California, where a number of elaborate sets were built for the film.

The film is noteworthy for not having any elaborate song or dance routines which had become staples in Temple's films for 20th Century Fox.

William S. Darling and David S. Hall were nominated for an Academy Award for Best Art Direction.

Plot
During the British Raj, Sergeant Donald MacDuff escorts Joyce Williams, an impoverished widow, and her young daughter, Priscilla, to a military outpost on the northern frontier of British occupied India to live with her stern father-in-law, Colonel Williams. Along the way, they witness the capture of freedom fighter chief Khoda Khan. Soon, Priscilla, nicknamed 'Wee Willie Winkie' by MacDuff, wins the hearts of all the soldiers, especially her grandfather and MacDuff; even Khoda Khan is touched by her visits to cheer him up in his captivity, and her returning a lost necklace to him. Meanwhile, her mother is courted by Lieutenant Brandes.

Khoda Khan is rescued by his men in a night raid and a fight breaks out. MacDuff is fatally wounded while out on patrol. He dies in the hospital while Priscilla sings "Auld Lang Syne" to him.

Priscilla decides to persuade Khoda Khan to stop fighting when Mohammet Dihn, a soldier who is actually Khan's spy, smuggles her out of the base and takes her to the rebel mountain fortress. Khan is greatly pleased; he thinks that the colonel will bring his entire regiment in a hopeless attempt to rescue her. British troops arrive, demanding Khan surrender Priscilla; his men prepare for battle, and he orders that Dihn be thrown over a wall, presumably to death.

Colonel Williams halts his force out of range and walks alone to the entrance. A few of Khan's men start shooting at Williams, and Priscilla rushes to her grandfather's side. Impressed by the colonel's courage and overcome with empathy for the child, Khan orders his men to stop firing. He agrees to negotiate and the war ends.

Cast
 Shirley Temple as Priscilla 'Winkie' Williams
 Victor McLaglen as Sergeant Donald MacDuff
 C. Aubrey Smith as Colonel Williams
 Cesar Romero as Khoda Khan
 June Lang as Joyce Williams
 Michael Whalen as Lieutenant 'Coppy' Brandes
 Constance Collier as Mrs. Allardyce
 Douglas Scott as Mott
 Gavin Muir as Captain Bibberbeigh
 Willie Fung as Mohammet Dihn
 Brandon Hurst as Bagby
 Lionel Pape as Major Allardyce
 Clyde Cook  as Pipe Major Sneath
 Lauri Beatty as Elsie Allardyce
 Lionel Braham as Maj. Gen. Hammond
 Mary Forbes as Mrs. MacMonachie
 Cyril McLaglen as Cpl. Tummel
 Pat Somerset as Officer
 Hector V. Sarno as Driver
 Harry Tenbrook as Soldier (uncredited)

Production
Until The Little Princess (1939), this was Shirley Temple's most expensive film. Production of Wee Willie Winkie had to be moved from the Fox studio lot to Chatsworth, California, owing to intense conflicts taking place between labor unions and Hollywood studios. During one standoff, a Fox studio messenger visiting the set nearly had a light dropped on his head after scolding a stagehand who complained about working conditions. During the shooting of the film, Temple's mother, Gertrude, was hospitalized for two weeks with an unspecified stomach ailment.

Ford was notorious for his distaste of working with child stars, but he was drawn to this movie for its large budget and strong supporting cast, including Ford favorite Victor McLaglen. He was initially indifferent towards Temple, but his demeanor changed after the famous death scene of Sgt. MacDuff, as he was pleased with the restraint shown in her performance and impressed by her professionalism.  Temple and Ford remained friends for many years after this movie was finished. Ford was later the godfather of Temple's oldest daughter.

Shortly after completion of this film, an unknown gunman fired a shot at Temple and her mother as they were walking into their home with a group of other people.

According to Temple, this was her favorite film: Of all my films I rate Wee Willie Winkie the best, but for all the wrong reasons. It was best because of its manual of arms, the noisy marching around in military garb with brass buttons, my kilts bouncing. It was best because of daredevil stunts with snipers and stampeding horses. It was also best because I finally seemed to earn the professional respect of someone so blood-and-thunder macho as Ford. Best of all, the watery-blue color of my portable dressing room had been repainted in regimental red.

Reception
Frank S. Nugent of The New York Times called the film "a pleasing enough little fiction, sure to delight every Temple addict and likely to win the grudging approval even of those who, like myself, are biding their time until she grows up, becomes gawky and is a has-been at 15." Variety praised the film's "realistic and elaborate backgrounds and tense reality", as well as "good comedy" between Temple and McLaglen, but suggested that the film was too long for Temple's younger fans to be able to sit through. Harrison's Reports wrote "Very good! Although Shirley, as usual, predominates, the producers have wisely surrounded her with capable players...The story has comedy, romance, and thrills, and holds one's attention throughout." John Mosher wrote that the film "isn't much as a Shirley Temple tryout...Miss Temple's talent is rather overexploited at times, and she seems just a bit too pert."

Libel action against Graham Greene
Writing for Night and Day in 1937, Graham Greene gave the film a mildly good review, complaining about the manufactured ingenue of the star's handlers, but otherwise observing that the Hollywood treatment is an improvement over the original Kipling version. The review employed a number of characterizations of the star that provoked Temple and the British and American branches of Twentieth-Century Fox to sue Greene, Night and Day, its publisher (Chatto and Windus), and its printers (Hazell, Watson and Viney) for libel. The case appeared before the King's Bench in 1938 and a settlement was announced the following day. Speaking on behalf of Greene, Night and Day, and the publisher, the counsel for the defense Valentine Holmes reframed the review "which, his clients instructed him, [as] one to see which anybody could take their children". The Lord Chief Justice who prevailed over the hearing declared the printed "libel ... simply a gross outrage" and fined the defendants £3500.

Home media
In 2009, the film was available on videocassette and DVD in both the original black-and-white and in computer-colorized versions.  Some editions had theatrical trailers and special features.

See also
 Shirley Temple filmography

Notes

References

External links
 
 
 
 
 Wee Willie Winkie at the Iverson Movie Ranch
 Iverson Movie Ranch: History, vintage photos.

1937 films
20th Century Fox films
American black-and-white films
American children's films
1930s English-language films
Films scored by Alfred Newman
Films based on works by Rudyard Kipling
Films directed by John Ford
Films set in India
Films set in the British Raj
Films produced by Darryl F. Zanuck
American adventure films
1937 adventure films
Films shot in Los Angeles
1930s American films